Penkala may refer to:

 Slavoljub Eduard Penkala
 TOZ Penkala, a manufacturer of stationery products
 14134 Penkala